Krestnikovo is a rural locality (a settlement) in Klyazminskoye Rural Settlement, Kovrovsky District, Vladimir Oblast, Russia. The population was 272 as of 2010. There are 13 streets.

Geography 
Krestnikovo is located 25 km southeast of Kovrov (the district's administrative centre) by road. Cheremkha is the nearest rural locality.

References 

Rural localities in Kovrovsky District